Colburn is a small unincorporated census-designated place in northeastern Washington Township, Tippecanoe County, in the U.S. state of Indiana.

It is part of the Lafayette, Indiana Metropolitan Statistical Area.

History
Colburn was originally called Chapmanville.

A post office was established at Colburn in 1860, and remained in operation until it was discontinued in 1988.

Geography
Colburn is located at 40°31'07" North, 86°42'51" West (40.518611, -86.714167) in Washington Township, at an elevation of 662 feet. Nearby communities include Lafayette (12 miles southwest), Delphi (6 miles north), Buck Creek (4 miles south) and Americus (3.5 miles west).

Demographics

References

Unincorporated communities in Tippecanoe County, Indiana
Unincorporated communities in Indiana
Census-designated places in Tippecanoe County, Indiana
Census-designated places in Indiana
Lafayette metropolitan area, Indiana